The  1963 Manchester Openshaw by-election was held on 5 December 1963. It was held due to the death of the incumbent Labour MP, W. R. Williams.  The by-election was won by the Labour candidate Charles Morris.

References

By-elections to the Parliament of the United Kingdom in Manchester constituencies
1963 elections in the United Kingdom
1963 in England
1960s in Manchester